The 2012 Evolution Championship Series (commonly referred to as Evo 2012 or EVO 2012) was a fighting game event held at Caesars Palace, Las Vegas on July 6–8. The event featured a major tournament for six fighting games, including Super Street Fighter IV: Arcade Edition and Ultimate Marvel vs. Capcom 3, as well as various smaller-scale competitions.

Background

Held in Caesar's Palace, Las Vegas, Evo 2012 featured over 3,500 entrants among its six major tournaments. The tournaments held at Evo 2012 were livestreamed through the Twitch online video service. A "Road to Evo" tournament series started in January 2012, in which competitors could earn seeding points for the main event.

Games
Six major tournaments were held at Evo 2012. The games played were:
Super Street Fighter IV: Arcade Edition 2012
Ultimate Marvel vs. Capcom 3
 Street Fighter X Tekken
 Mortal Kombat
 The King of Fighters XIII
 Soulcalibur V

Evo 2012 was the first event in the Championship Series to include a major King of Fighters tournament. The 2011 reboot of the Mortal Kombat series benefited from multiple balancing updates after its release, allowing the game to be popular among the fighting game community where earlier games in the series weren't. The Mortal Kombat tournament featured the second-largest prize pool at Evo 2012, after Street Fighter IV. Spin-off Street Fighter X Tekken, meanwhile, was unpopular among the fighting game community at the time. The game featured various bugs and unbalanced aspects.

The event also featured various smaller-scale competitions, such as an exclusive Super Street Fighter II Turbo tournament, and side tournaments for Virtua Fighter 5: Final Showdown and Skullgirls. Sony showcased a playable demo for PlayStation All-Stars Battle Royale, while NetherRealm Studios revealed gameplay footage of Injustice: Gods Among Us at Evo 2012.

Tournament summary
While the recent release of Street Fighter x Tekken caused players to juggle between more familiar aspects of the characters and the game's more unusual features, the King of Fighters XIII tournament was praised by commentators for its high-level play, unexpected for such a new game. Meanwhile, Brenna Hillier of VG247 described the Mortal Kombat tournament at Evo 2012 as a "mixed bag", featuring plenty of unusual play styles.

Though there was a lot of discussion regarding whether the character Phoenix in Marvel vs. Capcom is overpowered compared to other selectable characters in the game, competitor Filipino Champ won the tournament with the characters Magneto, Dormammu and Doctor Doom. The final match at Evo 2012 was the Street Fighter IV finals, in which Infiltration defeated GamerBee to claim the title.

Results

References

Evolution Championship Series
2012 in sports in Nevada
2012 in esports
Caesars Palace